The St. Louis Walk of Fame honors notable people from St. Louis, Missouri, who made contributions to the culture of the United States. All inductees were either born in the Greater St. Louis area or spent their formative or creative years there. Contribution can be in any area; most of the current inductees made their achievements in acting, entertainment, music, sports, art/architecture, broadcasting, journalism, science/education and literature.

, the walk has more than 150 brass stars and bronze plaques, each bearing an inscription of an inductee's name and a summary of his or her accomplishments. The stars and plaques are set into the sidewalks along a  stretch of Delmar Boulevard in the Delmar Loop area, spanning the border between St. Louis and University City.

History
The walk was founded by developer Joe Edwards, owner of Blueberry Hill pub/restaurant and other establishments located along the walk. Its first stars and plaques were installed in 1989; the inductees that year were musician Chuck Berry, dancer and choreographer Katherine Dunham, bridge builder James B. Eads, poet T. S. Eliot, ragtime composer Scott Joplin, aviator Charles Lindbergh, baseball player Stan Musial, actor Vincent Price, newspaper publisher Joseph Pulitzer and playwright Tennessee Williams. Ten more were selected for each of the next four years (in order to get the walk established), but starting in 1994 no more than three have been awarded in any year.

In May 2008, Cedric the Entertainer received the first star and plaque located in the City of St. Louis portion of the loop. The walk (and the boundaries of the Delmar Loop in general) has been expanded eastward by Edwards in recent years as Edwards continues to invest in the area's redevelopment.

Selection process
Anyone can submit a nomination by mail by supplying basic identification information as well as a description of the nominee's accomplishments and connection to St. Louis. About 30 to 40 finalists are culled from the nominees by the walk's founder and director; the finalists are sent to a selection committee of 120 St. Louisans. The selection committee has been variously described as:
 "the chancellors of all area universities, key people from local libraries, arts organizations and historical societies, media journalists, and other citizens with an informed understanding of St. Louis' cultural heritage;"
or
 "university chancellors, previous inductees and representatives of arts organizations, historical societies and libraries."

Prior to 2007, the open-air induction ceremony was held regularly on the third week of May; since then, it is held on a less regular basis, subject to the availability of those being inducted.

Some of the walk's inductees, including Dick Gregory, Jackie Joyner-Kersee, and Ozzie Smith, are also in the nearby, unrelated Gateway Classic Hall of Fame.

Inductees 

 Maya Angelou
 Henry Armstrong
 Josephine Baker
 Scott Bakula
 Fontella Bass
 Mel Bay
 James "Cool Papa" Bell
 Thomas Hart Benton
 Yogi Berra
 Chuck Berry
 Susan Blow
 Christine Brewer
 Lou Brock
 Robert S. Brookings
 Jack Buck
 Grace Bumbry
 T Bone Burnett
 William S. Burroughs
 Harry Caray
 Cedric the Entertainer (Cedric Antonio Kyles)
 Kate Chopin
 Auguste Chouteau
 William Clark
 Bill Clay (William L. Clay)
 Barry Commoner
 Arthur Holly Compton
 Jimmy Connors
 Carl and Gerty Cori
 Bob Costas
 John Danforth
 William Danforth
 Dwight Davis
 Miles Davis
 Dizzy Dean
 Dan Dierdorf
 Phyllis Diller
 Rose Philippine Duchesne
 Katherine Dunham
 Robert Duvall
 James B. Eads
 Tom Eagleton
 Charles Eames
 Gerald Early
 Buddy Ebsen
 T. S. Eliot
 William Greenleaf Eliot
 Stanley Elkin
 Mary Engelbreit
 Walker Evans
 Lee Falk
 Eugene Field
 The Fifth Dimension
 Curt Flood
 Redd Foxx
 David Francis
 Frankie Muse Freeman
 Joe Garagiola Sr.
 Dave Garroway
 William Gass
 Martha Gellhorn
 Bob Gibson
 John Goodman
 Betty Grable
 Evarts Graham
 Ulysses S. Grant
 Dick Gregory
 Charles Guggenheim
 Robert Guillaume
 Henry Hampton
 Walker Hancock
 John Hartford
 Donny Hathaway
 Whitey Herzog
 Al Hirschfeld
 William Holden
 Rogers Hornsby
 A. E. Hotchner
 William Inge
 Hale Irwin
 The Isley Brothers
 William B. Ittner
 Johnnie Johnson
 Scott Joplin
 Elizabeth Keckley
 Jackie Joyner-Kersee
 Albert King
 Kevin Kline
 Pierre Laclede
 Rocco Landesman
 Rita Levi-Montalcini
 Charles Lindbergh
 Theodore Link
 Elijah Lovejoy
 Ed Macauley
 Marsha Mason
 Masters and Johnson (William H. Masters and Virginia E. Johnson)
 Bill Mauldin
 Virginia Mayo
 Tim McCarver
 Michael McDonald
 Robert McFerrin Sr.
 David Merrick
 Archie Moore
 Marianne Moore
 Agnes Moorehead
 Stan Musial
 Nelly (Cornell Iral Haynes Jr.)
 Howard Nemerov
 Butch O'Hare
 Gyo Obata
 Ridley Pearson
 Marlin Perkins
 Mike Peters
 Bob Pettit
 Vincent Price
 Joseph Pulitzer
 Harold Ramis
 Judy Rankin
 Peter Raven
 Paul C. Reinert
 Branch Rickey
 The Rockettes
 Irma S. Rombauer
 Janice Rule
 Charles M. Russell
 David Sanborn
 Red Schoendienst
 Dred and Harriet Scott
 Ntozake Shange
 Henry Shaw
 William T. Sherman
 George Sisler
 Leonard Slatkin
 Jackie Smith
 Ozzie Smith
 Willie Mae Ford Smith
 Max Starkloff
 Sara Teasdale
 Clark Terry
 Kay Thompson
 Henry Townsend
 Helen Traubel
 Ernest Trova
 Ike Turner
 Tina Turner
 Mona Van Duyn
 Dick Weber
 Mary Wickes
 Tennessee Williams
 Carl Wimar
 Shelley Winters
 Harriett Woods
 Chic Young

See also

 List of awards for contributions to culture
 List of halls and walks of fame
 List of people from St. Louis

References

External links

stlouiswalkoffame.org, the walk's official website

1989 establishments in Missouri
Awards established in 1989
Awards for contributions to culture
Halls of fame in Missouri
Missouri-related lists
Walks of fame
Tourist attractions in St. Louis